Abel B. Sarmientos  (born ) is a Cuban male volleyball player. He was part of the Cuba men's national volleyball team at the 1992 Summer Olympics.

References

1962 births
Living people
Cuban men's volleyball players
Place of birth missing (living people)
Volleyball players at the 1992 Summer Olympics
Olympic volleyball players of Cuba
Pan American Games medalists in volleyball
Pan American Games silver medalists for Cuba
Pan American Games bronze medalists for Cuba
Medalists at the 1983 Pan American Games
Medalists at the 1987 Pan American Games
Medalists at the 1995 Pan American Games